Miguel Elias Rojas Naidernoff (born February 24, 1989) is a Venezuelan professional baseball infielder for the Los Angeles Dodgers of Major League Baseball (MLB). He made his MLB debut with the Dodgers in 2014 and also played in MLB for the Miami Marlins from 2015 to 2022.

Professional career

Cincinnati Reds
Rojas was signed by the Cincinnati Reds organization as an amateur free agent in 2006, and played in their minor league system through 2012, making it as far as the AAA Louisville Bats to end his 2012 season.

Los Angeles Dodgers

After the 2012 season, Rojas became a free agent and signed with the Los Angeles Dodgers organization. He spent the 2013 season with the Chattanooga Lookouts of the Class AA Southern League, where he hit .233 in 130 games. In 2014, he received a non-roster invite to Major League spring training, where he was given a chance to compete for the vacant second base job. The Dodgers assigned him to the AAA Albuquerque Isotopes to start 2014, where he hit .302 in 51 games.

The Dodgers promoted Rojas to the major leagues for the first time on June 6, 2014. He made his major league debut that day as a late-inning defensive replacement. His first hit was a single off Matt Belisle of the Colorado Rockies in his first start on June 8.

Rojas finished the 2014 regular season hitting only .181 with one home run and nine RBIs in 85 games. He frequently took over for Hanley Ramírez at shortstop late in games for defensive purposes. On June 18, he successfully made an extremely difficult defensive play to preserve a no hitter thrown by Clayton Kershaw in the 7th inning.

Miami Marlins

On December 10, 2014, the Dodgers traded Rojas, along with Dee Gordon and Dan Haren, to the Miami Marlins in exchange for Andrew Heaney, Chris Hatcher, Austin Barnes, and Enrique "Kiké" Hernández. In 2015, Rojas batted .282/.329/.366 with one home run and 17 RBI in 142 at-bats across 60 games. This earned Rojas more playing time the next season as he appeared in 123 games, slashing .247/.288/.325 with one home run and 14 RBI.

In 2017, Rojas missed 62 games due to a broken thumb, but still appeared in 90 games, hitting for a .290.361/.375 batting line with one home run and 26 RBI in 272 at-bats. Rojas also led all NL shortstops in September and October with a .354 batting average and .948 OPS. In 2018, Rojas set career-highs in nearly every offensive category; games played (153), runs (44), hits (123), home runs (11), RBI (53), and stolen bases (6).

In 2019, Rojas batted .284/.331/.379, with the lowest isolated power in the National League (.095). On September 23, 2019, Rojas agreed to a new two-year contract with the Marlins, worth $10.25 million. In late July 2020, Rojas tested positive for COVID-19. Despite testing positive, Rojas partnered with the company Stadium Custom Kicks during the 2020 season, branding the partnership as Miggy's Locker. The partnership allowed Rojas to design custom-made cleats to express his passion in shoes and basketball. Overall in 2020, Rojas's batting line was all career-highs, with a .304/.392/.496 line on the year to go along with four home runs and 20 RBI. 

In 2021, Rojas played in 132 games, collecting 131 hits, 48 RBIs, 13 stolen bases, and a career-high 37 walks. On October 28, 2021, the Marlins signed Rojas to a two-year contract extension worth $10 million.

Los Angeles Dodgers (second stint)
On January 11, 2023, Rojas was traded back to the Dodgers in exchange for Jacob Amaya. On February 4, the Dodgers announced a contract extension with Rojas that would pay him $5 million for 2024 and included a $5 million club option for 2025.

See also
 List of Major League Baseball players from Venezuela

References

External links

1989 births
Living people
Albuquerque Isotopes players
Arizona League Reds players
Billings Mustangs players
Carolina Mudcats players
Chattanooga Lookouts players
Dayton Dragons players
Dominican Summer League Reds players
Jacksonville Jumbo Shrimp players
Louisville Bats players
Los Angeles Dodgers players
Lynchburg Hillcats players
Major League Baseball players from Venezuela
Major League Baseball shortstops
Miami Marlins players
New Orleans Baby Cakes players
New Orleans Zephyrs players
Pensacola Blue Wahoos players
People from Los Teques
Tiburones de La Guaira players
Venezuelan expatriate baseball players in the Dominican Republic
Venezuelan expatriate baseball players in the United States
Venezuelan Summer League Reds players
Venezuelan Summer League Devil Rays/Reds players
Venezuelan people of Bulgarian descent